Renato Dotti (26 August 1914 - 1984) was an Italian high jumper who was 6th in the high jump at the 1934 European Athletics Championships, two-time national champion at senior level (1934, 1938).

He also won a bronze medal at the 1939 International University Games (held in Vienna), sponsored by Nazi Germany, the rival games of the 1939 International University Games (held in Monte Carlo).

National records
 High jump: 1.92 m ( Bologna, 23 July 1938) - record holder until 18 June 1939.

Achievements

See also
 Men's high jump Italian record progression
 Italy at the 1934 European Athletics Championships

References

External links
 Renato Dotti at The-Sports.org

1914 births
1984 deaths
Italian male high jumpers
Sportspeople from Arezzo